Lotsij is a surname. Notable people with the surname include:

Dirk Lotsij (1882–1965), Dutch footballer and Olympian
Geert Lotsij (1878–1959), Dutch rower and Olympian
Paul Lotsij (1880–1910), Dutch rower and Olympian

Surnames of Dutch origin